Mohit Chauhan is an Indian playback singer. Best known as a singer in Hindi films, he also sings in other Indian languages including Pahari, English, Bengali, Gujarati, Kannada, Marathi, Tamil, Punjabi and Telugu.

Annual Central European Bollywood Awards
The Annual Central European Bollywood Awards are fan awards with the voters mostly from Germany, Austria and Switzerland. They are users of the Bollywood Forum belonging to the film website, organizer of the ACEBAs. Chauhan has received one awards from five nominations.

BIG Star Entertainment Awards
The BIG Star Entertainment Awards are presented annually by Reliance Broadcast Network Limited in association with Star India to honour personalities from the field of entertainment across movies, music, television, sports, theater and dance. Chauhan has received an award from three nominations.

Bollywood Hungama Surfers Choice Music Awards 
Bollywood Hungama Surfers Choice Music Awards were presented by Bollywood Hungama to honour the musical work of the artists throughout the year. The winners have been selected based on the number of votes acquired by each of the contenders. These awards have been discontinued after 2015.

daf BAMA Awards
daf BAMA award are Multicultural Musical Award at International Level where Best Male Act are selected as per online voting by the people corresponding to their country.

Filmfare Awards
The Filmfare Awards are one of the oldest and most prestigious Hindi film awards. They are presented annually by The Times Group for excellence of cinematic achievements. Chauhan received two awards from five nominations.

Global Indian Music Academy Awards
The GiMA Best Male Playback Singer Award is given by Global Indian Music Academy as a part of its annual Global Indian Music Academy Awards for Hindi films, to recognise a male playback singer who has delivered an outstanding performance in a film song. Chauhan received two awards from six nominations.

IIFA Award
The IIFA Best Male Playback Award is chosen by the viewers and the winner is announced at the ceremony.

Mirchi Music Awards
The Mirchi Music Awards are presented annually by Radio Mirchi to honour both artistic and technical excellence of professionals in the Hindi language film music industry of India.

RMIM Puraskaar
The RMIM Puraskaar borrows its name from the news group rec.music.indian.misc, the oldest community of Hindi Film Music lovers on the net. These awards voice the opinion of HFM listeners scattered all over the Internet including on forums, groups, blogs, and social networks. Shreya Ghoshal has won twelve awards from twenty-four nominations in different categories till date.

Screen Award

The Screen Award for Best Male Playback is chosen by a distinguished panel of judges from the Indian Bollywood film industry and the winners are announced in January.

South Indian International Movie Awards
South Indian International Movie Awards, also known as the SIIMA Awards, rewards the artistic and technical achievements of the South Indian film industry.

Star Guild Awards
The Producers Guild Film Award for Best Male Playback Singer (previously known as the Apsara Award for Best Male Playback Singer) is given by the producers of the film and television guild as part of its annual award ceremony to recognise the best Indian film of the year.

als in the Hindi language film industry of India. The awards were first introduced in 2013.

Vijay Awards
The Vijay for Best Male Playback Singer is given by STAR Vijay as part of its annual Vijay Awards ceremony for Tamil (Kollywood) films. The award was first given in 2007.
Mohit Chauhan is the first and only Bollywood singer to win this award.

Zee Cine Awards
The Zee Cine Award Best Playback Singer- Male is chosen by the jury of Zee Entertainment Enterprises as part of its annual award ceremony for Hindi films, to recognise a male playback singer. Following its inception in 1998, a ceremony wasn't held in 2009 and 2010, but resumed back in 2011. Chauhan received three awards from five nominations.

Other awards and honors

Special Achievements

•Brands Academy Indian Of the Year - 2017
•Green Ambassador of Sikkim - 10 May 2018

References

Lists of awards received by Indian musician